Ali Haji Ali (born April 7, 1948 or March 11, 1950) is a Member of Parliament in the National Assembly of Tanzania. He is a member of the ruling Chama Cha Mapinduzi party and was its Secretary General in 1989. He is a member of the Zanzibar House of Representatives.

References

1948 births
Living people
Chama Cha Mapinduzi politicians
Members of the National Assembly (Tanzania)